Willy Gretor, born Vilhelm Rudolf Julius Petersen (16 July 1868, in Wundlacken Castle, near Königsberg – 31 July 1923, in Copenhagen) was a Danish painter and art dealer, who spent most of his life in Germany and Paris.

Life and work 
His father, Hans Christian Petersen, was a merchant from Flensburg. In 1889, he went to Lübeck. There, he became acquainted with members of the "Ibsenklub" (named after the playwright, Henrik Ibsen); a group of liberal young people who met to exchange ideas, about modern literature that had an aura of "mystery and scandal". 

This network of relationships also led to a group trip to Paris, during which he began an affair with the painter, Maria Schorer. For unknown reasons, they decided to take assumed names for their artworks. Maria became Maria Slavona, and he chose the name Willy Gretor.

From 1890 to 1891, he held several exhibitions in Paris, which led him to his next affair, with the painter, . This time, however, the affair became marriage. One of their children was the journalist, . 

He then largely gave up painting to work as an art dealer in England, France and Spain. In that capacity, he was involved as a middleman in the controversial sale of the wax bust, Flora, which was purchased by the Bode Museum in Berlin, from the English art dealer Murray Marks (1840-1918), in the belief that it was by Da Vinci. Its true authorship has yet to be established to everyone's satisfaction.

For a short time, Frank Wedekind was Gretor's secretary. It is generally assumed that Gretor served as the prototype for the title character in Wedekind's play, The Marquis of Keith.

References

Further reading 
 Lilly Ackermann: Willy Grétor, das Urbild des „Marquis von Keith“. In: Uhu, Vol.3, #6 (March 1927), pp.55–59.
 "Gretor, Willy". In: Ulrich Thieme, Fred. C. Willis (Eds.): Allgemeines Lexikon der Bildenden Künstler von der Antike bis zur Gegenwart, Vol. 15: Gresse–Hanselmann. E. A. Seemann, Leipzig 1922, pp.3–4 (Online)
 Ulrike Wolff-Thomsen: Willy Gretor (1868–1923). Seine Rolle im internationalen Kunstbetrieb und Kunsthandel um 1900, Ludwig, Kiel 2006,  
 Raffaella Bucolo: "Eine Lübeckerin in Rom. Die Archäologin Margarete Gütschow (1871–1951)". In: Zeitschrift für Lübeckische Geschichte, Vol.96, 2016, pp.177–190.

External links 

1868 births
1923 deaths
Danish painters
Art dealers
Royal Danish Academy of Fine Arts alumni
Artists from Königsberg